Paul Chesley is an American photojournalist born in Red Wing, Minnesota who is best known for his work as a photographer for the National Geographic Society.

Career
Paul Chesley was introduced to the art of photography by his father at the age of three when he was given his first camera.  He grew up taking pictures on family vacations and developing film in his dad's darkroom.
Chesley's early work focused on natural subjects and landscapes and in the early 1970s he began taking photography classes at Colorado Mountain College as well as participating in workshops at the Center of the Eye in Aspen, Colorado.
Chesley also participated as a student on a National Geographic workshop led by Robert Gilka, the society's director of photography.
Chesley began shooting assignments for National Geographic in 1975 and has since completed more than 35 projects for the society. His photography has focused primarily on people and cultures in Oceania, Asia and Europe. In 1984, Chesley helped found Photographers/Aspen, a photo collective of four National Geographic photographers.  In 1989, Chesley met and became friends with Hunter S. Thompson while producing a story on Aspen for Life magazine.

In an interview with Stephen Metcalf for Accent Thai magazine Chesley stated that he doesn't consider himself a schooled photographer. ‘Almost everything I’ve learned has come from my experience in the field’ he says.
According to John Agnone, National Geographic book editor, Chesley '...Takes graphically strong images that communicate the essence of his subjects – and he makes it look easy.' When asked to describe Chesley's style of photography, Carole Lee a former project coordinator for Chesley stated ‘Paul's sensitivity captures the gentle spirit in people.’
Fellow Minnesotan and National Geographic photographer Jim Brandenburg said of Paul, 'With so many photographers out there constantly boasting about their work, Paul contradicts the profession. Chesley holds his projects very dear.  he goes about his work in a quiet but dignified and steadfast way.  And most of all, he lets his work speak for itself.'

Recognition

Chesley's work was included in the National Geographic Society's first major exhibition, The Art of Photography at National Geographic; A 100-Year Retrospective, held at the Corcoran Gallery of Art in Washington, D.C. in 1988.

His images have also been exhibited in museums in London, Tokyo, New York, and Honolulu. His photographic essays have been featured regularly in Life, Fortune, GEO, Stern, Newsweek, and Time. In 2006 Chesley received a Pele award of excellence for photographs contributed to a public service print project titled Our Liliha.  In 2013 Goff Books published a retrospective of Chesley's career titled Paul Chesley A Photographic Voyage.

Bibliography

References

External links
 Paul Chesley's official website
 Paul Chesley's official book website
 Paul Chesley's images at National Geographic Creative

American photojournalists
Living people
National Geographic photographers
Year of birth missing (living people)